Valley Springs may refer to some places in the United States:

 Valley Springs, Arkansas, located in Boone County
 Valley Springs, California, located in Calaveras County
 Valley Springs, South Dakota, located in Minnehaha County